Emily Mahin Beihold (born January 21, 1999) is an American singer-songwriter. She released her debut EP Infrared in 2017. In 2020 she was noticed by music promotion brand Live2 LCC who subsequently teamed up with her to help promote music going forward. After signing to Republic Records and Moon Projects, she released her major-label debut single, "Numb Little Bug" in 2022 which led her rise to fame. On July 22, 2022, Beihold released her second EP, Egg in the Backseat.

Early life
Emily Beihold was born on January 21, 1999, in Los Angeles, California. Her mother immigrated from Iran to the United States during the Iranian Revolution. At the age of six, Beihold began to play the piano when she saw it in a shop window and she begged her parents to let her learn the piano, and consequently began writing songs at the age of seven. The first song that she wrote when she was seven was "America Home".

In 2017, Beihold attended the University of California, San Diego where she competed in NCAA Fencing and received NCAA All-American Honors in 2019.

Career
In the film, I'm Not Here, director Michelle Schumacher invited Beihold to write a track for the film. She wrote the song, "Not Who We Were".

She released a string of singles after that and received attention on the social media platform TikTok for her song "City of Angels". On May 28, 2021, Beihold released her song "Groundhog Day", which too gained popularity via TikTok. She was subsequently signed on to Republic Records, with whom she released her most successful single, "Numb Little Bug". In May 2022, Beihold released the single "Too Precious".

On July 22, 2022, she released her second EP, Egg in the Backseat. Egg in the Backseat explored themes of her mental health problems and her relationships. On July 27, 2022, she signed to Sony Music Publishing. 

Beihold also began touring in 2022, and opened for King Princess, AJR, and the Jonas Brothers.

Musical influences
Beihold cites Queen and Regina Spektor as her influences, and grew up listening to Feist, Fiona Apple, Kate Nash, Sara Bareilles, and Lily Allen.

Discography

Extended plays

Singles

References

External links
 
 

1999 births
American people of Iranian descent
American TikTokers
American women musicians
American women songwriters
Living people
Republic Records artists
Sony Music Publishing artists
American women singer-songwriters
University of California, San Diego alumni